Mars is a rural locality (a village) in Gorkovsky Selsoviet, Kushnarenkovsky District, Bashkortostan, Russia. The population was 78 as of 2010. There is 1 street.

Geography 
Mars is located 31 km northwest of Kushnarenkovo (the district's administrative centre) by road. Saitovo is the nearest rural locality.

References 

Rural localities in Kushnarenkovsky District